The 1975 Georgia Tech Yellow Jackets football team represented the Georgia Institute of Technology during the 1975 NCAA Division I football season. The Yellow Jackets were led by second-year head coach Pepper Rodgers, and played their home games at Grant Field in Atlanta.

Schedule

Sources:

Roster
QB #9 Rudy Allen, Sr.
RB #30 A. Rodriguez Cabarrocas
WR Steve Raible, Sr.

References

Georgia Tech
Georgia Tech Yellow Jackets football seasons
Georgia Tech Yellow Jackets football